Sergei Anatolyevich Shumeyko (born 17 February 1993) is a former Russian professional football player.

Club career
He made his Russian Football National League debut for SKA-Energiya Khabarovsk on 24 August 2014 in a game against Sibir Novosibirsk.

External links
 
 
 Career summary by sportbox.ru
 Player profile on FNL site

1993 births
People from Pochepsky District
Living people
Russian footballers
Association football defenders
FC Tyumen players
FC SKA-Khabarovsk players
FC Torpedo Moscow players
Riga FC players
FC Avangard Kursk players
FC Fakel Voronezh players
MFK Zemplín Michalovce players
Russian expatriate footballers
Expatriate footballers in Latvia
Russian expatriate sportspeople in Latvia
Expatriate footballers in Slovakia
Russian expatriate sportspeople in Slovakia
Latvian Higher League players
Slovak Super Liga players
FC Volga Ulyanovsk players
Sportspeople from Bryansk Oblast